David Nixon (born March 16, 1985) is a former American football linebacker. He was an undrafted free agent signing in the 2009 NFL Draft with the Oakland Raiders. He played college football at Brigham Young University.

He has also played for the Houston Texans and St. Louis Rams.

College career
Nixon attended Brigham Young University and was an All-Mountain West Conference second-team selection his senior season. During his final season as a team captain Nixon set a new Mountain West Conference record with his 43 career tackles for loss and finished the season second on the team in tackles with 90. During his career with the Cougars Nixon tallied 275 tackles.

Professional career

Oakland Raiders
Immediately following the draft Nixon signed as a rookie free agent with the Raiders. Following training camp Nixon was signed to the Raiders practice squad on September 6, 2009. On November 21, 2009 Nixon was promoted to the active roster and appeared in 3 regular season games. Nixon participated in the Raiders 2010 training camp but was placed on waivers on September 4, 2010.

Houston Texans
Nixon was claimed on waivers by the Texans and played 3 regular season games notching 10 tackles. The Texans waived Nixon on October 19, 2010.

St. Louis Rams
Nixon was signed to the Rams practice squad joining fellow BYU linebacker Bryan Kehl on the Rams roster. Nixon was signed to the Rams active roster on December 7, 2010. Nixon was waived on August 6, 2011.

Miami Dolphins
On August 9, 2011 Nixon signed with the Miami Dolphins. Nixon was cut during final cuts prior to the regular season.

St. Louis Rams
Nixon was re-signed by the Rams on November 9, 2011. He was released on March 12, 2012.

Carolina Panthers
Nixon signed with the Carolina Panthers on July 26, 2012 but was released during final cuts.

Broadcasting
In October 2011, Nixon was signed by BYUtv Sports to serve as an analyst for pre-game and post-game shows on BYUtv. His first appearance doing such was the pre-game show for the game against Oregon State on October 15, 2011. Nixon also provided analysis during halftime for the BYUtv live broadcast of the Idaho State game on October 22, 2011. As BYUtv expanded its college football shows, Nixon was also added as a football analyst for  After Further Review, and BYU Sports Nation.

Personal life
Nixon is a member of the Church of Jesus Christ of Latter-day Saints.  He served a mission for the Church in Ecuador and speaks fluent Spanish. Nixon's sister, Emily, married former BYU quarterback and current New Orleans Saints tight end,  Taysom Hill.

References

External links
BYU bio
Twitter

1985 births
Living people
American football linebackers
Brigham Young University alumni
Latter Day Saints from Texas
American Mormon missionaries in Ecuador
21st-century Mormon missionaries
BYU Cougars football announcers
BYU Cougars football players
Oakland Raiders players
Houston Texans players
St. Louis Rams players
Miami Dolphins players